This list contains extinct arthropod genera from the Cambrian Period of the Paleozoic Era.

Artiopoda

Dinocaridida

Malacostraca

Mandibulata

Marrellomorpha

Maxillopoda

Megacheira

Ostracoda

Trilobita

Incertae sedis

References 

Cambrian arthropods